Jukeboxer In The Food Chain is an album released in 2004 by Jukeboxer. The songs were constructed digitally using music editing programs. It was recorded at Noah Wall's home in Brooklyn.

Track listing
 Pilgrim – 6:35 {Wall}
 Missing Link – 3:08 {Wall}
 Chance Openings – 3:24 {Wall}
 Banj – 2:29 {Wall}
 Thursday – 3:25 {Wall}
 Terrestrial – 3:07 {Wall}
 Opportunist – 4:05 {Wall}
 My Eyes Are Only – 2:30 {Wall}
 Dooey – 0:58 [Wall]
 Russian Doll – 2:07 {Wall}
 House Burning Down – 7:03 {Wall}

Personnel
Noah Wall – All instruments
Amy Jones – Vocals
Tim Barnes – Tabla on "Banj"
Gillian Chadwick – Vocals on "Opportunist"
Aaron Mullan – Acoustic guitar on "Russian Doll"
Lyrics by Noah Wall, Amy Jones, Gillian Chadwick, David Chadwick, Matt Elkind, Paul Erb
Mastering by John Golden
Cover photo by Jaap Buitendijk

2004 albums
Jukeboxer albums